Haugh and Scots  hauch, from Old English halh, healh, is a term referring to a low-lying meadow in a river valley.

An example is Derwenthaugh, which is situated in the Metropolitan Borough of Gateshead, Tyne and Wear. It had previously been part of County Durham, but it became incorporated into the metropolitan county of Tyne and Wear and Borough of Gateshead in 1974. The area is now a country park.

References 

Old English
Germanic words and phrases